Fragilariopsis is a genus of diatoms belonging to the family Bacillariaceae.

The genus has cosmopolitan distribution.

Species

Species:

Fragilariopsis acuta 
Fragilariopsis angulata 
Fragilariopsis atlantica 
Fragilariopsis kerguelensis

References

Bacillariales
Diatom genera